Eike Dieter Schmidt (born 22 April 1968) is a German art historian. Since November 2015 he has been director of the Uffizi in Florence.

Life
Born in Freiburg, he studied medieval and modern art at the University of Heidelberg. In the 1990s he studied at the University of Bologna on an Erasmus Scheme bursary. He then studied at the Kunsthistorisches Institut in Florenz until 2001, again on a bursary.

He then moved to the US, becoming a curator at the National Gallery of Art in Washington D.C. in 2001 and then at the J. Paul Getty Museum in Los Angeles from 2006 to 2008. He then moved to London to become its European departmental director for sculpture and art.

In 2009 he gained his doctorate at the University of Heidelberg with a dissertation on "The Medici Ivory Sculpture Collection in the 17th Century". From 2009 to 2015 he was director of the Department of Sculpture, Decorative Arts and Textiles at the Minneapolis Institute of Art, planning and curating several exhibitions and creating a sub-department of Jewish Art. He also curated Diafane passioni, a major exhibition on Baroque sculpture at Florence's Palazzo Pitti in 2013.

He was a member of the valuation commission for the Maastricht International Antiques Fair from 2010 to 2015 and in 2015 became director of the Uffizi, its first ever non-Italian director.

References 

Directors of the Uffizi
Heidelberg University alumni
Writers from Freiburg im Breisgau
Living people
1968 births